Klub hokeja na ledu Mladost, commonly referred to as KHL Mladost or simply Mladost, is a Croatian ice hockey team that currently plays in the Croatian Ice Hockey Championship.

The club was founded in 1946 as part of HAŠK Mladost and in 1986 became the independent under the name KHL Mladost – Zagreb.

The KHL Mladost ("Youth") organization puts a large emphasis on junior development.

Honours
 Yugoslav Ice Hockey League
Winners (2): 1946–47, 1948–49

 Croatian Ice Hockey League
Winners (2): 2008, 2021

 Panonian League
Winners (1): 2008

References

External links
Official website 

Ice hockey teams in Croatia
Ice hockey clubs established in 1946
Croatian Ice Hockey League teams
Yugoslav Ice Hockey League teams
Panonian League teams
Slohokej League teams
Interliga (1999–2007) teams
Sports teams in Zagreb
Slovenian Ice Hockey League teams